Social mortgage is a term used in Catholic social teaching. According to this body of thought, the social mortgage is the conditions under which humanity is allowed to use the goods of the world (which are viewed as part of God's creation). Use of the world's resources is bound up with responsibility towards the rest of humanity.

Description
Although there is a right to private property, it is not an absolute right; in particular, no one has the right to accumulate large amounts of private property while others in the world lack the basic requirements for survival and development. This is embodied most fully in Pope John Paul's encyclical Laborem exercens, when he states that (regarding the right to private property) "Christian tradition has never upheld this right as absolute and untouchable. On the contrary, it has always understood this right within the broader context of the right common to all to use the goods of the whole of creation: The right to private property is subordinated to the right to common use, to the fact that goods are meant for everyone".

Pope John Paul II was the first to coin this term in his encyclical, Sollicitudo rei socialis. He explains that the term "social mortgage" (pignus sociale) has principally a social function, and this is based on the universal destination of all goods. The goods that are accumulated are not meant to be reserved or hoarded, but are "meant for all".

References

Catholic theology and doctrine
Catholic social teaching